An asterisk is a typographic symbol, the glyph ⟨*⟩.

Asterisk may also refer to:
 Asterisk (esports), an esports organization
 Asterisk (liturgy), a liturgical implement 
 Asterisk (PBX), a software implementation of a private branch exchange (PBX)
 "Asterisk" (song), by Orange Range

See also 
 * (disambiguation)
 Asterism (typography), (⁂)
 Asterix (disambiguation)
 Star (disambiguation)